Louis, Duke of Brittany, or variations on this name, may refer to:

 Louis XII of France (1462-1515), who by marriage to Anne, Duchess of Brittany, was Duke of Brittany
 Louis, Duke of Brittany (1704–1705), eldest son of Louis of France, Duke of Burgundy and Princess Marie-Adélaïde of Savoy
 Louis, Duke of Brittany (1707–1712), second son of Louis, Duke of Burgundy and Princess Marie-Adélaïde of Savoy